The Men's 10,000m event at the 2010 South American Games was held on March 21 at 17:00.

Medalists

Records

Results
Results were published.

Intermediate times:

See also
2010 South American Under-23 Championships in Athletics

References

External links
Report

10000 M